Deh-e Bad-e Olya (also Romanized as Deh-e Bād-e ‘Olyā and Deh Bad Olya; also known as Deh Bād) is a village in Chenarud-e Jonubi Rural District, Chenarud District, Chadegan County, Isfahan Province, Iran. At the 2006 census, its population was 159, in 37 families.

References 

Populated places in Chadegan County